Iglesia de la Purísima Concepción is a church located in Santa Maria Xoxoteco, some 2.5 kilometers east of San Agustín Metzquititlán, Mexico. The church is noted for its 16th century Xoxoteco murals, which are considered unique in Latin America.

References

Roman Catholic churches in Mexico